Amanuel Mesel Tikue (born 29 December 1990) is an Eritrean long-distance runner. At the 2012 Summer Olympics, he competed in the 5000 metres, finishing 33rd in round 1, failing to qualify for the final. He placed 21st in the marathon at the 2016 Summer Olympics.

References

Eritrean male long-distance runners
Eritrean male marathon runners
1990 births
Living people
Olympic athletes of Eritrea
Athletes (track and field) at the 2012 Summer Olympics
World Athletics Championships athletes for Eritrea
21st-century Eritrean people